The Porsche Racing Drivers Association motor racing championship was started in 1991 by Jeff May. The 2-litre, front-engined Porsche 924 cars were augmented in 2010 by the 3.2 litre, mid-engined Boxster models with the opening Boxster championship being won by David Clark. The 2012 season saw the introduction of a production class for Boxsters to run alongside the existing fully converted race-spec Boxsters and the 924s. The Championship is organized by a committee and run under the British Racing and Sports Car Club.

Classes
The three-class structure offers drivers an opportunity to race competitively, with a clear route for racing progression.

Class C 924

Powered by a 2-litre 4 cylinder engine driving the rear wheels, the 924 has run in the Championship since its foundation. Cheap to buy, low-tech and easy to maintain, the 924 makes the series the cheapest way to enter single-marque Porsche racing in the UK.

Class B Production Boxster

This class was added for the 2012 season in an attempt to reduce the cost of entry to Boxster racing. The 3.2 litre 986 Boxster cars use original Porsche standard suspension and 17" wheels.

Class A Race Boxster

Class A consists of fully converted 3.2 litre 986 or 987 Boxsters on Gaz shock absorbers, Team Dynamics Rimstock ProRace 1.3 wheels and Toyo R888 tyres. An aero package was added for the 2017 season.

List of Champions
 1992: Remy Bopp
 1993: Richard Lloyd
 1994: Michael Neuhoff
 1995: Paul Stephens
 1996: Gerry Taylor
 1997: Nick Adams
 1998: Tony Brown
 1999: Mark McAleer
 2000: Mark McAleer
 2001: Keith Penman
 2002: Ryan Hooker
 2003: James Neal
 2004: Chris Milne
 2005: Steve Cheetham
 2006: Gary Duckman
 2007: Graham Heard
 2008: Matt Davies
 2009: Will Penrose
 2010: Dave Clark (Boxster), Andrew Hannington (924)
 2011: Dave Clark (Boxster), Steven Brown (924)
 2012: Richard Styrin (Race Spec Boxster), Stephen Potts (Production Boxster), Alastair Kirkham (924)
 2013: Richard Styrin (Race Spec Boxster), Rebecca Jackson (Production Boxster), Alastair Kirkham (924)
 2014: Jonathan Greensmith (Race Spec Boxster), Jayson Flegg (Production Boxster), Simon Hawksley (924)
 2015: Ed Hayes (Race Spec Boxster), Michael Goodacre (Production Boxster), Adam Croft (924)
 2016: Rick Styrin (Race Spec Boxster), Andy Baker (Production Boxster), Linda Warren (924)
 2017: Ed Hayes (Race Spec Boxster), Andy Baker (Production Boxster), Pip Hammond (924)
 2018: Adam Southgate (Race Spec Boxster), Leigh Bowden (Production Boxster), Gavin Johnson (924)
 2019: Garry Lawrence (Class A Supersport Boxster), Pete Smith (Class D Classic 924)

Season Calendars

2020 season 

After a season (2019) with very low numbers, the BRSCC took the decision to hand the Championship over to the CALM All Porsche Trophy for 2020. The PDA committee disbanded.

2019 season 
Title sponsor: Toyo Tires; Partners: Hartech Porsche Specialists, Pie Performance
 Round 1 - 23 / 24 March - Brands Hatch (Indy) - 2 Races
 Round 2 - 20 / 21 April - Snetterton 300 - 3 Races
 Round 3 - 11 / 12 May - Cadwell Park - 3 Races
 Round 4 - 6 / 7 July - Croft Circuit - 3 Races
 Round 5 - 27 / 28 July - Brands Hatch (Indy) - 2 Races
 Round 6 - 17 / 18 August - Anglesey - 2 Races
 Round 7 - 5 / 6 October - Silverstone (Int'l) - 3 Races
 Round 8 - 19 / 20 October - Donington Park - 3 Races

For 2019, all classes were renamed (Class A Supersport, Class C Production Boxster, Class D Classic 924) and a class for 2.7 litre engined Boxsters (Class B Sport Boxster 2.7) was introduced. This new class was the first to permit fitting of a bolt-in roll cage for the Boxster to help minimise conversion costs.

2018 season 
Title sponsor: Toyo Tires; Partners: Jasmine Porschalink, Hartech Porsche Specialists, Wharfside Electrical, Ryan Motorsport Insurance
 Round 1 - 24 March - Oulton Park - 2 races
 Round 2 - 12 & 13 May - Knockhill - 3 races
 Round 3 - 2 & 3 June - Cadwell Park - 2 races
 Round 4 - 23 & 24 June - Rockingham - 3 races
 Round 5 - 14 & 15 July - Castle Combe - 3 races
 Round 6 - 11 & 12 August - Anglesey Intl - 3 races
 Round 7 - 8 & 9 September - Brands Hatch (Indy) - 3 races
 Round 8 - 20 & 21 October - Donington (Indy)  - 3 races

The 2018 season saw the introduction - as an experiment - of compulsory pit stops in the third race of selected rounds. The PDA supported BRSCC's new TCR UK Series at Knockhill (the PDA's first visit to that circuit) and Castle Combe and benefitted from live streamed video coverage as a result.

2017 season 
Title sponsor: Toyo Tires; Partners: Jasmine Porschalink, Hartech Porsche Specialists, Wharfside Electrical, Autosport Apparel, Ryan Motorsport Insurance
 Round 1 - 25 March - Oulton Park - 2 races
 Round 2 - 8 & 9 April - Silverstone International - 3 races
 Round 3 - 6 & 7 May - Cadwell Park - 2 races
 Round 4 - 10 & 11 June - Snetterton 300 - 3 races
 Round 5 - 15 & 16 July - Castle Combe - 3 races
 Round 6 - 5 & 6 August - Anglesey Intl - 3 races
 Round 7 - 16 & 17 September - Rockingham - 3 races
 Round 8 - 21 & 22 October - Brands Hatch  - 3 races

The 2017 season included a special anniversary race, celebrating 25 years since the championship was founded. 18 cars entered, taking part in two sprint races on the Donington Park Indy circuit.

2016 season 
Title sponsor: Toyo Tires; Partners: Jasmine Porschalink, Hartech Porsche Specialists, FineDrinks Cooperative, Wharfside Electrical, Royal Purple UK
 Snetterton 300 	2 / 3 April 2016 	3 Races
 Rockingham 	14 / 15 May 2016 	3 Races
 Oulton Park 	25 June 2016 	2 Races
 Castle Combe 	16 / 17 July 2016 	2 Races
 Anglesey 	6 / 7 August 2016 	3 Races
 Donington Park 	27 / 28 August 2016 	3 Races
 Mallory Park 	25 September 2016 	3 Races
 Silverstone (International) 	15 / 16 October 2016

2015 season 
Title sponsor: Toyo Tires; Partners: Jasmine Porschalink; Fuchs
 18 Apr Oulton Park
 16 May Rockingham
 20 June Zandvoort
 18 July Cadwell Park
 22 Aug Brands Hatch
 12 Sept Croft
 17 Oct Silverstone (International)

2014 season
Title sponsor: Toyo Tires; Partners: Jasmine Porschalink
 5 / 6 April	Silverstone (International)
 10 May	Croft
 7 / 8 June	Zolder
 12 / 13 July	Rockingham
 9 / 10 August	Anglesey
 30 August	Oulton Park
 21 September	Brands Hatch (Indy)
 18 / 19 October	Donington Park

2013 season
Title sponsor: Toyo Tires; Partners: Jasmine Porschalink, webheads
 6 / 7 April	Rockingham
 11 / 12 May	Silverstone (National)
 8 / 9 June	Zandvoort
 13 / 14 July	Snettteron 300
 3 / 4 August	Brands Hatch
 31 August   	Oulton Park
 21 September	Cadwell Park
 19 / 20 October	Donington Park

2012 season
Title sponsor: The Logson Group
 31 March    	Oulton Park
 28 / 29 April 	Snetterton 300
 13 May	        Cadwell Park
 9 / 10 June	Brands Hatch
 28 / 29 July Silverstone (National)
 18 /19 August	Rockingham
 8 / 9 September	Croft Circuit
 20 / 21 October 	Donington Park

2011 season
Title sponsor: design911
 10 April 2011	Silverstone
 15 May 2011	Donington
 6 June 2011	Cadwell Park
 18 June 2011	Oulton Park
 17 July 2011	Rockingham
 14 August 2011	Brands Hatch
 18 September 2011	Snetterton

2010 season
 Rounds 1&2–10 April 2010	Cadwell Park
 Rounds 3&4–8 May 2010	Oulton Park
 Rounds 5&6–28 May 2010	Snetterton
 Rounds 7&8–26 June 2010	Anglesey
 Rounds 9&10–18 July 2010	Mallory
 Rounds 11&12–29 August 2010	Rockingham
 Rounds 13&14–12 September 2010	Brands Hatch
 Rounds 15&16–24 October 2010	Snetterton

2009 season

2008 season
 Rounds 1& 2: Snetterton (Norfolk) – 30 March 2008
 Rounds 3 & 4: Silverstone (Northamptonshire) – 12 & 13 April 2008
 Round 5: Oulton Park (Cheshire) – 10 May 2008
 Rounds 6 & 7: Cadwell Park (Lincolnshire) – 22 June 2008
 Rounds 8 & 9: Anglesey (North Wales) – 19 & 20 July 2008
 Rounds 10 & 11: Brands Hatch (Kent) – 16 & 17 August 2008
 Rounds 12 & 13: Mallory Park (Leicestershire) – 28 September 2008

References

External links

BRSCC

Auto racing series in the United Kingdom